Rock climbing hammers, also known as wall hammers, big wall hammers, or aid hammers, are a type of specialty hammer used mainly  in aid climbing for the placement and removal of pitons, copper-heads, and circle-heads. They can also be used in the initial placement of  fixed anchors (bolts) or the forceful removal of stuck free climbing protection.

See also 
 Bolt
 Climbing equipment
 Piton

References 

Climbing equipment